The 1908 International Lawn Tennis Challenge was the eighth edition of what is now known as the Davis Cup. For the first time, ties were held in different countries and at different times, rather than all the matches being played in the same venue, as before. It also marked the first time that a tie was played in Australia.

After Australasia's victory in 1907, the United States and the British Isles tried to re-claim the cup, however the Australasia team prevailed again. The final was played at the Albert Ground in Melbourne, Australia on 27–30 November.

Final
United States vs. British Isles

Challenge Round
Australasia vs. United States

References

External links
Davis Cup official website

Davis Cups by year
International Lawn Tennis Challenge
International Lawn Tennis Challenge
International Lawn Tennis Challenge